William Savile, 2nd Marquess of Halifax (1665 – 31 August 1700) was the son of George Savile, 1st Viscount Halifax and Dorothy Savile, Viscountess Halifax (née Spencer).  He was educated in Geneva in 1677 and matriculated at Christ Church, Oxford in 1681, but did not take a degree.  He travelled on the continent in 1684–1687, returning on his brother's death.  From that time, he was known as Lord Elland, from his father's subsidiary title of Baron Savile of Elland.

He was elected Member of Parliament for Newark-on-Trent from 1689 to 1695.  He was a Tory and voted in 1689 that the throne was not vacant.

He had four daughters including:
By his first wife, Elizabeth Grimston, the daughter of Sir Samuel Grimston, whom he married on 24 November 1687:
Lady Anne Savile (1691 – 18 July 1717) who married Charles Bruce, 4th Earl of Elgin (1682–1747)
By his second wife, Lady Mary Finch, who was the first cousin of his first wife, daughter of Daniel Finch, 7th Earl of Winchilsea, whom he married on 2 April 1695
Lady Mary Savile, who in 1722 married Sackville Tufton, 7th Earl of Thanet, and died in 1751
Lady Dorothy Savile (1699–1758), who married Richard Boyle, 3rd Earl of Burlington.

He died in 1700, at an early age from "an inward feavour". Having died without male issue, the title became extinct, but was succeeded in his baronetcy by a cousin.

References

Sources

Mark N. Brown, "Savile, George, first marquess of Halifax (1633–1695)", Oxford Dictionary of National Biography, Oxford University Press, Sept 2004; online edn, Oct 2009 , accessed 20 March 2010

1665 births
1700 deaths
Alumni of Christ Church, Oxford
English MPs 1689–1690
English MPs 1690–1695
Marquesses of Halifax